Nemotelus congruens is a species of soldier fly in the family Stratiomyidae.

Distribution
Peru, Chile.

References

Stratiomyidae
Insects described in 1914
Diptera of South America
Taxa named by Kálmán Kertész